Broadway is a station on the Long Island Rail Road's Port Washington Branch in the East Flushing and Broadway neighborhoods of Queens, New York City. The station is east of a rail overpass at the intersection of 162nd Street and Northern Boulevard. This station contains ramps that comply with the Americans with Disabilities Act (ADA), making it fully accessible.

History
Originally built on October 27, 1866, by the New York and Flushing Railroad, Broadway Station was originally named as East Flushing station until May 1872 when it was renamed Broadway for its adjacent neighborhood and a section of Northern Boulevard. The present elevated station was built in 1913. By the 1930s the street section changed to avoid confusion with another Broadway located in western Queens, but the station and neighborhood name remained the same. Two restoration projects took place during the early 21st century: one in 2003 that restored the station house, and another between 2007 and 2008 that restored the platforms and added wheelchair ramps to meet Americans with Disabilities Act (ADA).

Station layout

The station has two high-level elevated side platforms, each ten cars long. There is a pedestrian underpass by the station building at 164th Street, in addition to an overpass at 167th Street, just east of the station. Additionally, there is an underpass for Northern Boulevard that contains a sidewalk. The station house contains a waiting room, an LED display, and restrooms. The building's hours are weekdays between 5:00 AM and 2:00 PM. Ticket machines are located on the outside of the station house on platform A and are Full Service and Daily versions. Free parking is available on the side of platform A on both sides of the station house; there are 2 accessible spots and reserved spots for ticket purchasing.

On the platform, LED lights and displays are present with a Public Address (PA) system. Tactile platform edge strips are also present which meet the Americans with Disabilities Act (ADA). There are also waiting shelters with seating and heating as well as benches. Trash cans are present throughout the station and Safety signs in addition to station name signs. There are also "Mind The Gap" warnings painted on the platform that marks approximately where the door stops when the train is stopped.

References

External links

Station house/ Waiting Room from Google Maps Street View
Platforms & Station House Entrance from Google Maps Street View
 Station from Google Maps Street View (then under construction)

Long Island Rail Road stations in New York City
Railway stations in Queens, New York
Railway stations in the United States opened in 1866
Flushing, Queens
1866 establishments in New York (state)